Boosterism is the act of promoting ("boosting") a town, city, or organization, with the goal of improving public perception of it. Boosting can be as simple as talking up the entity at a party or as elaborate as establishing a visitors' bureau.

History
During the expansion of the American and Canadian West, boosterism became epidemic as the leaders and owners of small towns made extravagant predictions for their settlement, in the hope of attracting more residents and, not coincidentally, inflating the prices of local real estate. During the nineteenth century, competition for economic success among newly founded cities led to overflow of booster literature that listed the visible signs of growth, cited statistics on population and trade and looked to local geography for town success reasons. 

The 1871 humorous speech The Untold Delights of Duluth, delivered by Democratic U.S. Representative J. Proctor Knott, lampooned boosterism.  Boosterism is also a major theme of two novels by Sinclair Lewis—Main Street (published 1920) and Babbitt (1922). As indicated by an editorial that Lewis wrote in 1908 entitled "The Needful Knocker", boosting was the opposite of knocking. The editorial explained:

The short story "Jeeves and the Hard-boiled Egg" (1917) by P.G. Wodehouse includes an encounter with a convention visiting from the fictional town of Birdsburg, Missouri who talk up their town:

Boosting is also done in political settings, especially in regard to disputed policies or controversial events. The former UK prime minister Boris Johnson is strongly associated with such behaviour.

See also
Advertising
Potemkin Village
Promotion (marketing)
Puffery

References

External links

The Promised Land, by Pierre Berton
Babbitt by Sinclair Lewis
 The Untold Delights of Duluth, a speech by a US congressman in 1871, introduced by David McCullough

Promotion and marketing communications
History of United States expansionism
Community development
Political science terminology